Our Lady of the Sacred Heart College (abbreviated as OLSH College) is an independent Roman Catholic single-sex secondary day school for girls, conducted in the traditions of the Daughters of Our Lady of the Sacred Heart, located in the eastern Sydney suburb of Kensington, New South Wales, Australia.

The College was founded in 1897 by members of the Daughters of Our Lady of the Sacred Heart, a religious congregation founded by Father Jules Chevalier in France in 1874. The College provides a religious and general education for approximately 800 girls from Year 7 to Year 12.

History and description
The College was moved to the Kensington site in 1913 and until 1995 was administered by the Sisters. It is part of the system of schools under the auspices of the Catholic Education Office in the Archdiocese of Sydney.

At its opening, the college was an impoverished Catholic school, with little or no support from the government. As a result, the schools oldest structure, the Fyfe Wing, was not completed immediately, and construction stalled during 1914 when funds dried up. In 1915, the Franciscan friar Tony Macfarlane was assigned to teach mathematics and science at the school. Friar Tony Macfarlane had a strong background in carpentry and a brief career as a Civil Engineer prior to taking his vows as a monk. Friar Macfarlane took it upon himself to complete the construction of the school's main building, in an effort to remove classes from the OLSH convent next door. The OLSH nuns were involved in administration and some minor laboring work, with many parishioners volunteering their knowledge and labour time to help. The college was thus completed. The Fyfe Wing was listed as a heritage site in 1984.

Every year, the school celebrates this achievement on the Feast of St Francis. The school holds a bake sale, with all proceeds going to missionaries in Papua New Guinea and housing projects in the Northern Territory.

The college's present location in Kensington makes it accessible from the city and close to the University of New South Wales. It draws most of its students from the immediate local area and from Brighton-Le-Sands/Sans Souci. It is surrounded by community resources and leisure facilities.

The campus is adjacent to the OLSH Provincial House, OLSH Convent and St Joseph's Aged Care Facility. It is near the Sacred Heart Monastery, Chevalier Resource Centre, and the parish church and primary college of Our Lady of the Rosary.

The college has two sister schools of the same name, also founded by the Daughters of Our Lady of the Sacred Heart, one in Melbourne and the other in Adelaide. Each year exchange programs are run between the schools.

See also

List of Catholic schools in New South Wales
Catholic education in Australia

References

External links

OLSH College Kensington website

Catholic secondary schools in Sydney
Educational institutions established in 1897
Girls' schools in New South Wales
Kensington, New South Wales
1897 establishments in Australia
Alliance of Girls' Schools Australasia
Roman Catholic Archdiocese of Sydney